is a passenger railway station located in Nakahara-ku, Kawasaki, Kanagawa Prefecture, Japan, operated by the East Japan Railway Company (JR East).

Lines
Hirama Station is served by the Nambu Line.

Station layout
The station consists of two opposed side platforms serving two tracks, connected by a footbridge. The station is staffed.

Platforms

History 
Hirama Station opened as a station on the Nambu Railway on 9 March 1927. The Nambu Railway was nationalized on 1 April 1944, and the station came under the control of Japanese National Railways (JNR). With the privatization of JNR on 1 April 1987, the station was absorbed into the JR East network.

Passenger statistics
In fiscal 2019, the station was used by an average of 14,930 passengers daily (boarding passengers only).

The passenger figures (boarding passengers only) for previous years are as shown below.

Surrounding area
Hirama Ginza Shopping Street 
Kanagawa Prefectural Kawasaki Technical High School
Kawasaki Municipal Tachibana High School

See also
 List of railway stations in Japan

References

External links

  

Railway stations in Kawasaki, Kanagawa
Nambu Line
Stations of East Japan Railway Company
Railway stations in Japan opened in 1927